Emma Fitting-Ramel (21 November 1900 – 13 November 1986) was a Swiss fencer. She competed in the women's individual foil at the 1924 Summer Olympics.

References

External links
 

1900 births
1986 deaths
Swiss female foil fencers
Olympic fencers of Switzerland
Fencers at the 1924 Summer Olympics